Myophoria is an extinct genus of bivalve mollusk from Europe belonging to the family Myophoriidae. Fossils are mainly found in Triassic rocks (251 to 200 mya).

Description
The shells of the species in this genus are triangular, with prominent ribs radiating from the apex and fine growth lines.

Species
Myophoria adornata
Myophoria beringiana
Myophoria brockensis
Myophoria cairnesi
Myophoria chenopus
Myophoria decussata
Myophoria ebbae
Myophoria gaytani
Myophoria harpa
Myophoria humboldtensis
Myophoria kuuoruensis
Myophoria lineata
Myophoria ornata
Myophoria proharpa
Myophoria reziae
Myophoria staggi
Myophoria transversa
Myophoria zeballos

References 

 Paleobiology Database
 Encyclopædia Britannica
 Sepkoski's Online Genus Database

Prehistoric bivalve genera
Trigoniida